The Poet Laureate of Delaware is the poet laureate for the U.S. state of Delaware. Poets are appointed to the position by the governor.
Nnamdi Chukwuocha and Albert Mills—twin brothers who are known as the "Twin Poets"—were appointed 17th Poets Laureate of the State of Delaware on December 13, 2015. According to the Library of Congress, they are the first co-laureates appointed by a state and the first siblings to share the position.

List of Poets Laureate

External Links
Poets Laureate of Delaware at the Library of Congress

See also

 Poet laureate
 List of U.S. states' poets laureate
 United States Poet Laureate

References

 
Delaware culture
American Poets Laureate